Progress M-17M, identified by NASA as Progress 49P, was a Progress spacecraft used by Roskosmos to resupply the International Space Station during 2012. The seventeenth Progress-M 11F615A60 spacecraft to launch, it had the serial number 417 and was built by RKK Energia. It was the 130th launch to the ISS and the twentieth Russian space launch in 2012. It was also the eleventh mission for the R-7 family of rockets since the beginning of the year.

On 15 April 2013, Progress M-17M cargo ship undocked from the Space Station. It was disposed six days later and fell into the Pacific Ocean on 21 April 2013.

Launch
The spacecraft was launched on time at 07:41:19 UTC on 31 October 2012 from Site 1/5 of the Baikonur Cosmodrome in Kazakhstan, atop a Soyuz-U carrier rocket. It was successfully deployed into low Earth orbit ten minutes later. At the time of launch, the ISS was about  ahead of the launch site. At the time of orbital insertion Progress was  behind the ISS.

Docking

Like the previous mission, Progress M-16M, Progress M-17M used a fast approach profile to the ISS, rendezvousing and docking on its fourth orbit, by opposition to 50 hours after the launch on most previous Progress flights. This profile allowed the transportation of critical biological payloads to the ISS. Following testing on Progress flights, the same rendezvous profile was introduced for crewed Soyuz flights in 2013 to reduce crew fatigue.

During the rendezvous sequence, the spacecraft performed several burns and rendezvous impulses to enter the proximity of the International Space Station. The KURS system on board the ISS as well as the Progress was activated for navigational purposes. Aboard the International Space Station, cosmonaut Yuri Malenchenko was standing by at the TORU system as Progress further came close to Space Station to assume manual control over the spacecraft if an issue with the automated docking was to be spotted. The other two cosmonauts Oleg Novitsky and Evgeny Tarelkin of Expedition 33 members were assisting Malenchenko and acquired engineering footage of the Progress spacecraft.

Russian Mission Controllers in Korolev, just outside Moscow verified that all systems on the spacecraft were performing nominally as well as the alignment with the docking port in the Zvezda module. With the final command approach issued, Progress fired its thrusters and followed a nominal approach profile. The docking to the Zvezda module occurred at 13:40 UTC on 31 October 2012, five hours fifty-nine minutes after launch. At the time of docking, the space station and the Progress were flying above Bogota, Colombia.

Undocking and decay
Progress M-17M undocked from the Space Station on 15 April 2013. The departure of the spacecraft cleared a docking port on the Zvezda module for the Progress M-19M resupply vehicle which was subsequently launched on 24 April 2013. In the following six days, the Progress M-17M spacecraft operated in an autonomous mode conducting a series of scientific experiments under the Radar-Progress project. At the end of the mission, Progress M-17M re-entered the Earth's atmosphere and fragments fell into the Pacific Ocean at 15:02 UTC on 21 April 2013.

Cargo

References

Progress (spacecraft) missions
Spacecraft launched in 2012
Spacecraft which reentered in 2013
Spacecraft launched by Soyuz-U rockets
Supply vehicles for the International Space Station